Adelptes clavipalpis is a species of beetle in the genus Adelptes. It was described in 1965.

References

Mordellinae
Beetles described in 1965